New Zealand competed at the 2013 World Aquatics Championships in Barcelona, Spain between 19 July and 4 August 2013.

Medalists

Open water swimming

New Zealand qualified four quota places for the following events in open water swimming.

Swimming

New Zealand swimmers achieved qualifying standards in the following events (up to a maximum of 2 swimmers in each event at the A-standard entry time, and 1 at the B-standard):

Men

Women

Synchronized swimming

New Zealand has qualified twelve synchronized swimmers.

Water polo

Men's tournament

Team roster

Thomas Kingsmill
Matthew Lewis
Stefan Curry
Finn Lowery
Jonathon Ross
Andrew Sieprath
Daniel Jackson
Matthew Small
Eamon Lui-Fakaotimanava
Matthew Bryant
Lachlan Tijsen
Adam Pye
Dylan Smith

Group play

Round of 16

Women's tournament

Team roster

Brooke Millar
Emily Cox
Kelly Mason
Nicole Lewis
Alexandra Boyd
Lynlee Smith
Sarah Landry
Danielle Lewis
Lauren Sieprath
Casie Bowry
Kirsten Hudson
Alexandra Myles
Ianeta Hutchinson

Group play

Round of 16

References

External links
Barcelona 2013 Official Site
Swimming New Zealand

Nations at the 2013 World Aquatics Championships
2013 in New Zealand sport
New Zealand at the World Aquatics Championships